DST is daylight saving time, a seasonal adjustment to civil time.

DST may also refer to:

Academia
 Delta Sigma Theta, an American organization of college-educated women
 Doctor of Sacred Theology, highest qualification in Roman Catholic theology

Businesses
 DST Systems, an American technology company
 Digital Signature Trust Company, a cryptographic root certificate authority (now owned by IdenTrust)
 Digital Sky Technologies, a Russian investment firm

Government, law and military
 Defence School of Transport, Leconfield, Yorkshire, England
 Defence Science and Technology Group, ancillary Australian national security agency
 Delaware statutory trust
 Department of Science and Technology (South Africa)
 Department of Science and Technology (India)
 Direction de la surveillance du territoire, defunct French intelligence agency
 Direction générale de la surveillance du territoire, Moroccan intelligence agency

Mathematics
 Dempster–Shafer theory, in probabilistic logic, a model of uncertainty
 Descriptive set theory, in logic
 Discrete sine transform, a Fourier transform variant
 Dynamical systems theory, related to chaos theory

Science
 Descending subtraction task, a clinical cognitive test
 Developmental systems theory, an evolutionary biology framework
 Dexamethasone suppression test, in endocrine medicine, a measure of adrenal gland function
 Dialogical self theory, in psychology
 Disturbance storm time index, in aeronomy, a measure of space weather near Earth
 Dystonin, a protein relevant to neurology and its related human gene

Technology

 Data Storage Technology, a 1992 magnetic-tape data-storage format
 Decision support tool, see Decision support system
 Deep Space Transport, a crewed interplanetary spacecraft concept
 Digital signature transponder, Texas Instruments' RFID device
 Direct Stream Transfer, a lossless audio compression format used by SACD
 Douglas Sleeper Transport, a 1940s aircraft model (precursor to the Douglas DC-3)
 Drill stem test, in oil exploration

See also 
DS&T